Entephria takuata is a species of geometrid moth in the family Geometridae. It is found in North America.

The MONA or Hodges number for Entephria takuata is 7302.

References

Further reading

 
 

Hydriomenini
Articles created by Qbugbot
Moths described in 1908